Samaná is a town and municipality in the Colombian Department of Caldas.

It is about 220 km north west of Bogota.

Facilities include the Parque Simon Bolívar park and the Fundacion Batuta Caldas academy of music.

Climate
Samaná has a relatively cool due to altitude and very wet tropical rainforest climate (Köppen Af). It is the wettest place in the department of Caldas.

References

Municipalities of Caldas Department